The Cognitive Science and Neuropsychology Program was organised by Csaba Pléh, in 1999 at the Institute of Psychology, University of Szeged. The aim of the program is to introduce the theories and methods of cognitive science and neuropsychology both to undergraduate students and researchers from other fields. The program welcome guest professors, international students and other interested students and researchers for participation and collaboration. The program has the intent of becoming an interface between cognitive labs and disciplines in cognitive science, broadly conceived in Central Europe. In 2011-2012 the members of this group left University of Szeged. This group is not exist anymore. The members went to the University of Debrecen, the Hungarian Academy of Sciences, Eötvös Loránd University, etc.

Cognitive Science and Neuropsychology Group in Szeged

Members (until 2011) 

 WINKLER, István
 SZOKOLSZKY, Ágnes
 RACSMÁNY, Mihály
 KRAJCSI, Attila
 NÉMETH, Dezső
 TISLJÁR, Roland
 CSIFCSÁK, Gábor
 JANACSEK, Karolina

See also 
 Institute of Psychology (Szeged)

References 

 A lélektan 80 éves története a szegedi egyetemen. = The Institute of Psychology at the University of Szeged is 80 years old (1929-2009)/ ed. by Ágnes Szokolszky; authors Szokolszky Ágnes, Pataki Márta, Polyák Kamilla et al. Szeged, JATEPress, 2009. 302 p. 
 Béla Pukánszky: Educational science and psychology. In: A Szegedi Tudományegyetem múltja és jelene : 1921-1998 = Past and present of Szeged University. /JATE. Szeged : Officina Ny., 1999. pp. 224–227.

External links 
 Nemeth, Janacsek et al: Learning in Autism: Implicitly Superb; PLOS ONE
World of cognition by Csaba Pléh
István Winkler at al.: Newborn infants detect the beat in music, in PNAS
Memory and Language Lab  - Szeged
Homepage of the Cognitive Science and Neuropsychology Group